Ted Long may refer to:
Theodore E. Long
Ted Long, a character in the Isaac Asimov novella The Martian Way
Ted Long (ice hockey), Canadian ice hockey player who played in the World Hockey Association

See also
Edward Long (disambiguation)
Theodore Long (disambiguation)